The 2008 Huntingdonshire District Council election took place on 1 May 2008 to elect members of Huntingdonshire District Council in Cambridgeshire, England. One third of the council was up for election and the Conservative Party stayed in overall control of the council.

After the election, the composition of the council was:
Conservative 38
Liberal Democrats 12
Independent 2

Background
Before the election the Conservatives controlled the council with 39 seats, compared to 11 Liberal Democrats and 2 independents. 18 seats were contested at the election by a total of 69 candidates, with the Conservatives defending 14 of the seats.

Among the councillors who were defending seats were the Conservative leader of the council, Ian Bates, in The Hemingfords ward, and the leader of the Liberal Democrats on the council, Peter Downes in Brampton. Ian Bates was challenged by an independent candidate, Maxine Hay, who had become a road safety campaigner after her son was killed after being hit by a car, with the Liberal Democrat candidate for the seat withdrawing in her favour.

Election result
The Liberal Democrats made a net gain of 1 seat to move to 12 councillors at the expense of the Conservatives who remained in control of the council with 38 seats. The Liberal Democrats gained seats in Buckden and Huntingdon East from the Conservatives, but lost a seat back to them in St Neots Eaton Socon.

Ward results

By-elections between 2008 and 2010

Ramsey April 2009
A by-election was held in Ramsey on 2 April 2009 after the death of Conservative councillor Ross Muir. The seat was held for the Conservatives by Andy Monk with a majority of 106 votes over Peter Reeve of the UK Independence Party.

Ramsey July 2009
A by-election was held in Ramsey on 23 July 2009 after the death of Liberal Democrat councillor Ray Powell. The seat was gained for the UK Independence Party by Peter Reeve with a majority of 184 votes over the Conservative Angela Curtis.

Huntingdon North
A by-election was held in Huntingdon North on 29 October 2009 after Liberal Democrat councillor Sam Kemp resigned from the council. The seat was held for the Liberal Democrats by Trish Shrapnel with a majority of 30 votes over Conservative Laine Kadic, in a seat won by the Conservatives at the last council election in 2008.

Fenstanton
A by-election was held in Fenstanton on 25 February 2010 after Conservative councillor Paul Dakers resigned from the council saying that all political parties were hopeless. The seat was gained by Liberal Democrat Colin Saunderson from the Conservatives, with a majority of 54 votes.

References

2008 English local elections
2008
2000s in Cambridgeshire